In the past, Archaeobalanidae has been considered a family of barnacles of the order Sessilia. Research published in 2021 by Chan et al. resulted in the genera of Archaeobalanidae being merged with that of Balanidae, which now contains the members of both families. In the same work, Sessilia was not retained as an order of barnacles.

See Also
 Balanidae for the family containing former members of Archaeobalanidae.
 List of Cirripedia genera for a list of barnacle families and genera.

References

 
Obsolete arthropod taxa